"Rollin' Stone" is a blues song recorded by Muddy Waters in 1950.  It is his interpretation of "Catfish Blues", a Delta blues that dates back to 1920s Mississippi. "Still a Fool", recorded by Muddy Waters a year later using the same arrangement and melody, reached number nine on the Billboard R&B chart. "Rollin' Stone" has been recorded by a variety of artists.

Earlier songs
In 1928, Jim Jackson recorded "Kansas City Blues Parts 3 and 4", a follow-up to his highly successful "Jim Jackson's Kansas City Blues Parts 1 and 2".  Jackson's lyrics included:

Several other early songs also explored variations on the catfish and/or fishing theme.  In 1941, Tommy McClennan and his sometime partner Robert Petway each recorded versions of the song.  Petway's was the first to be titled "Catfish Blues" and is sometimes cited as the basis for Muddy Waters' "Rollin' Stone". However, according to one biographer "They'd been singing "Catfish Blues" for years in the Delta, but it never sounded like "Rollin' Stone".

Muddy Waters song
"Rollin' Stone" has been identified (along with "Walkin' Blues", the single's B-side) as one of the first songs that Muddy Waters learned to play and an early favorite.  The words refer to the traditional proverb, "A rolling stone gathers no moss".

Called "a brooding, minor-hued drone piece", "Rollin' Stone" is a mid- to slow-tempo blues notated in 4/4 time in the key of E major.  Although the instrumental section uses the IV and V chords, the vocal sections remain on the I chord, giving the song a modal quality often found in Delta blues songs.  In addition to the traditional catfish verses, Waters added:

Unlike most of his early recordings which have bass or other instrumental accompaniment, "Rollin' Stone" is a solo performance by Muddy Waters on vocal and electric guitar.  It has "much empty space ... imbued with the power of a pause, of letting a note hang in the air, the anticipation of the next one".

"Rollin' Stone" was the first Muddy Waters record released on Chess Records and the second overall for the label (previous releases were on Aristocrat Records).  It did not reach the national record charts, but sold about 70,000 copies and allowed Muddy Waters to quit his day job.

Still a Fool
In 1951, Muddy Waters used the vocal melody and guitar figure from "Rollin' Stone" for "Still a Fool".  The  song was more successful, reaching number nine in the Billboard R&B chart.  Rather than a solo piece, Little Walter on second guitar and Leonard Chess on bass drum accompanied Muddy on vocal and guitar.  Subsequent versions of "Rollin' Stone" or "Catfish Blues" often use some lyrics from "Still a Fool" (sometimes called "Two Trains Running" after the opening verse).

Influence and recognition
According to music writer Robert Palmer, English blues rock group the Rolling Stones and the music magazine Rolling Stone took their names from the song.  However, magazine editor Jann Wenner explained:

In 2000, the song was honored with a Grammy Hall of Fame Award; in 2004, it was included at number 459 by Rolling Stone in its list of the "500 Greatest Songs of All Time". It was updated to number 465 in 2010. In 2019, the Blues Foundation inducted "Rollin' Stone" into the Blues Hall of Fame as a "Classic of Blues Recording".

In 1967, "Rollin' Stone" (and "Still a Fool") was used as part of Jimi Hendrix's "Catfish Blues", a homage to Muddy Waters,  and included on the albums BBC Sessions and Blues. Hendrix's signature songs "Voodoo Chile" and "Voodoo Child (Slight Return)" evolved from his "Catfish Blues".

References

External links

Muddy Waters songs
Blues songs
1950 songs
Chess Records singles
Grammy Hall of Fame Award recipients
Songs written by Muddy Waters